The Lawrence Batley Seniors was a senior (over 50s) men's professional golf tournament on the European Senior Tour. It was played from 1992 to 2002 in the Huddersfield area of West Yorkshire, England. From 1995 the tournament was held at Huddersfield Golf Club, north of Huddersfield, while in 1994 it was held at Woodsome Hall Golf Club, south-west of Huddersfield, and in 1992 and 1993 at both venues. The tournament was sponsored by Lawrence Batley who had earlier supported a European Tour event, the Lawrence Batley International, from 1981 to 1987. Batley died in August 2002, soon after the final tournament.

Neil Coles won the final tournament in 2002 and set a record as the oldest winner of a European Senior Tour event, aged 67 years and 276 days.

Winners

References

Former European Senior Tour events
Golf tournaments in England
Recurring sporting events established in 1992
Recurring sporting events disestablished in 2002
1992 establishments in England
2002 disestablishments in England